Sidney Lumet is an American director, producer, and screenwriter.

Lumet's most known films include the courtroom drama 12 Angry Men (1957), the holocaust drama The Pawnbroker (1964), the Cold War thriller Fail Safe (1964), the crime dramas Serpico (1973), and Dog Day Afternoon (1975) as well as the satirical news drama Network (1975), the psychological drama Equus (1977), the legal drama The Verdict (1982), and the crime thriller Before the Devil Knows You're Dead (2007).

Lumet received five Academy Award nominations winning the Honorary Oscar in 2004. He also received nine British Academy Film Award nominations as well as six Golden Globe Award for Best Director nominations winning for Network (1975). In 1961 he received a Primetime Emmy Award for Outstanding Directing for a Drama Series nomination for his work on NBC Sunday Showcase.

Major associations

Academy Awards

British Academy Film Awards

Golden Globe Awards

Primetime Emmy Award

Festival awards

Cannes Film Festival

Berlin International Film Festival

Venice Film Festival

References 

Lumet, Sidney